Peato Mauvaka (born 10 January 1997) is a French rugby union player. His position is hooker and he currently plays for Toulouse in the Top 14.

International career

International tries

Honours

International 
 France
Six Nations Championship: 2022
Grand Slam: 2022

Club 
 Toulouse
Top 14: 2018–19, 2020–21
European Rugby Champions Cup: 2020–2021

References

External links
France profile at FFR
Stade Toulousain profile
L'Équipe profile

1997 births
Living people
People from Nouméa
French people of New Caledonian descent
French rugby union players
Stade Toulousain players
Rugby union hookers
France international rugby union players
New Caledonian rugby union players